The 2010 FIVB World Grand Prix was a women's volleyball tournament to be played by 12 countries from 6–29 August 2010. The finals were held at the Beilun Gymnasium in Ningbo, China. The United States claimed their 3rd title and Foluke Akinradewo won the Most Valuable Player award.

 Standing and tie-breaking procedure:
Match won 3–0 or 3–1: 3 points for the winner, 0 points for the loser
Match won 3–2: 2 points for the winner, 1 point for the loser
In case of tie, the teams will be classified according to the following criteria:
number of matches won, points ratio and sets ratio

Competing nations
The following national teams qualified:

Teams

Calendar

Preliminary rounds

Ranking
The host China and top five teams in the preliminary round advanced to the Final round.

First round

Group A

Group B

Group C

Second round

Group D

Group E

Group F

Third round

Group G

Group H

Group I

Final round
Venue: Beilun Gymnasium, Ningbo, China

Final ranking

Overall ranking

Individual awards

Most Valuable Player:

Best Spiker:

Best Blocker:

Best Server:

Best Libero:

Best Setter:

Best Scorer:

References

External links
Official website of the 2010 FIVB World Grand Prix

FIVB World Grand Prix
2010 in Chinese sport
International volleyball competitions hosted by China
2010